Suzy Shortland (born 23 January 1974) is a former New Zealand female rugby union and sevens representative. She played at the 1998 and 2002 Women's Rugby World Cup.

Shortland was a member of the first official New Zealand women's sevens team, who took part in the 2000 Hong Kong Sevens. She also played at the 2001 Hong Kong Sevens.

References

1974 births
Living people
New Zealand women's international rugby union players
New Zealand female rugby union players
Female rugby sevens players
New Zealand women's international rugby sevens players